Wilson Chimeli (born 12 February 1989) is a Paraguayan footballer who plays as a forward for APS Zakynthos.

Career
In 2018, Chimeli signed for Argentine fifth division side Real Pilar after playing for River Plate (Asunción) in Paraguay, helping them reach the round of 16 of the 2018–19 Copa Argentina.

In 2020, he signed for Argentine second division club Deportivo Riestra.

References

External links
 
 

Living people
1989 births
Paraguayan footballers
Paraguayan expatriate footballers
Association football forwards
Club Olimpia (Itá) players
River Plate (Asunción) footballers
Real Pilar Fútbol Club players
Deportivo Riestra players
Club Almirante Brown footballers
A.P.S. Zakynthos players
Paraguayan expatriate sportspeople in Argentina
Paraguayan expatriate sportspeople in Greece
Expatriate footballers in Argentina
Expatriate footballers in Greece